Bodfish is a census-designated place (CDP) in the southern Kern River Valley of the Southern Sierra Nevada, in Kern County, California.

The population was 1,956 at the 2010 census, up from 1,823 at the 2000 census.

History

The place was named for George Homer Bodfish, who settled nearby in 1867.

The Bodfish post office first opened in 1892, closed in 1895, and re-opened in 1906. The Vaughn post office was moved to Bodfish in 1906.

Demographics

2010
At the 2010 census Bodfish had a population of 1,956. The racial makeup of Bodfish was 1,758 (89.9%) White, 4 (0.2%) African American, 50 (2.6%) Native American, 13 (0.7%) Asian, 3 (0.2%) Pacific Islander, 49 (2.5%) from other races, and 79 (4.0%) from two or more races. Hispanic or Latino of any race were 189 people (9.7%).

The whole population lived in households, no one lived in non-institutionalized group quarters and no one was institutionalized.

There were 881 households, 200 (22.7%) had children under the age of 18 living in them, 361 (41.0%) were opposite-sex married couples living together, 103 (11.7%) had a female householder with no husband present, 58 (6.6%) had a male householder with no wife present.  There were 76 (8.6%) unmarried opposite-sex partnerships, and 4 (0.5%) same-sex married couples or partnerships. 295 households (33.5%) were one person and 156 (17.7%) had someone living alone who was 65 or older. The average household size was 2.22.  There were 522 families (59.3% of households); the average family size was 2.77.

The age distribution was 379 people (19.4%) under the age of 18, 134 people (6.9%) aged 18 to 24, 329 people (16.8%) aged 25 to 44, 623 people (31.9%) aged 45 to 64, and 491 people (25.1%) who were 65 or older.  The median age was 50.1 years. For every 100 females, there were 102.7 males.  For every 100 females age 18 and over, there were 105.1 males.

There were 1,184 housing units at an average density of 148.3 per square mile, of the occupied units 660 (74.9%) were owner-occupied and 221 (25.1%) were rented. The homeowner vacancy rate was 3.5%; the rental vacancy rate was 11.0%.  1,366 people (69.8% of the population) lived in owner-occupied housing units and 590 people (30.2%) lived in rental housing units.

2000
At the 2000 census there were 1,823 people, 840 households, and 535 families living in the CDP. The racial makeup of the CDP was 91.28% White, 0.16% Black or African American, 2.25% Native American, 0.60% Asian, 0.05% Pacific Islander, 1.59% from other races, and 4.06% from two or more races.  5.43% of the population were Hispanic or Latino of any race.
Of the 840 households 19.4% had children under the age of 18 living with them, 49.3% were married couples living together, 10.5% had a female householder with no husband present, and 36.3% were non-families. 29.6% of households were one person and 17.6% were one person aged 65 or older.  The average household size was 2.17 and the average family size was 2.64.

The age distribution was 19.1% under the age of 18, 4.7% from 18 to 24, 19.3% from 25 to 44, 27.4% from 45 to 64, and 29.5% 65 or older.  The median age was 50 years. For every 100 females, there were 98.6 males.  For every 100 females age 18 and over, there were 96.8 males.

The median household income was $22,368 and the median family income  was $29,375. Males had a median income of $22,308 versus $14,926 for females. The per capita income for the CDP was $12,735.  About 9.9% of families and 15.9% of the population were below the poverty line, including 19.7% of those under age 18 and 9.0% of those age 65 or over.

References

Census-designated places in Kern County, California
Kern River Valley
Populated places in the Sierra Nevada (United States)
Populated places established in 1892
Census-designated places in California